Sioux County is a county in the U.S. state of Nebraska. As of the 2010 United States Census, the population was 1,311. Its county seat is Harrison.

Sioux County is included in the Scottsbluff, NE Micropolitan Statistical Area.

In the Nebraska license plate system, Sioux County is represented by the prefix 80 (it had the 80th-largest number of vehicles registered in the state when the license plate system was established in 1922).

Geography
Sioux County lies at the NW corner of Nebraska. Its north boundary line abuts the south line of the state of South Dakota and its west boundary line abuts the east boundary line of the state of Wyoming. The Niobrara River flows southeastward and eastward through the upper central part of the county. The county terrain is arid low rolling hills, sloping to the east and southeast. The terrain is sparsely utilized for agriculture, with some center pivot irrigation used.

Major highways

Protected areas

 Agate Fossil Beds National Monument
 Fort Robinson State Park (part)
 Gilbert-Baker Wildlife Area
 Nebraska National Forest (part)
 Peterson State Wildlife Area
 Soldier Creek Wilderness
 Oglala National Grassland (part)
 Toadstool Geologic Park
 Hudson-Meng Bison Kill

Adjacent counties

 Fall River County, South Dakota – north
 Dawes County – northeast
 Box Butte County – southeast
 Scotts Bluff County - south
 Goshen County, Wyoming - southwest
 Niobrara County, Wyoming - northwest

Demographics

As of the 2000 United States Census, there were 1,475 people, 605 households, and 444 families in the county. The population density was 0.7 person per square mile (0.3/km2). There were 780 housing units at an average density of 0.4 per square mile (0.14/km2). The racial makeup of the county was 97.63% White, 0.14% Native American, 0.20% Asian, 1.15% from other races, and 0.88% from two or more races. 2.31% of the population were Hispanic or Latino of any race. 36.9% were of German, 11.3% Irish, 11.0% American and 10.6% English ancestry.

There were 605 households, out of which 28.10% had children under the age of 18 living with them, 65.30% were married couples living together, 5.10% had a female householder with no husband present, and 26.60% were non-families. 23.60% of all households were made up of individuals, and 9.40% had someone living alone who was 65 years of age or older. The average household size was 2.44 and the average family size was 2.86.

The county population contained 24.30% under the age of 18, 7.20% from 18 to 24, 24.70% from 25 to 44, 27.50% from 45 to 64, and 16.20% who were 65 years of age or older. The median age was 42 years. For every 100 females there were 111.00 males. For every 100 females age 18 and over, there were 102.20 males.

The median income for a household in the county was $29,851, and the median income for a family was $31,406. Males had a median income of $23,409 versus $21,490 for females. The per capita income for the county was $15,999. About 11.10% of families and 15.40% of the population were below the poverty line, including 24.40% of those under age 18 and 7.50% of those age 65 or over.

Communities

Towns
 Harrison (county seat)

Unincorporated Communities
 Agate
 Andrews
 Glen
 Joder
 Story

Ghost Towns
 Montrose
 Orella

Politics
Sioux County voters are reliably Republican. In no national election since 1936 has the county selected the Democratic Party candidate. In 2020, Donald Trump won the highest share of the vote ever in the county, with 87.8% of the vote.

See also
 National Register of Historic Places listings in Sioux County NE

References

External links
 Sioux County website

 
1877 establishments in Nebraska
Populated places established in 1877